Lotte Lie (born  6 September 1995 in Levanger) is a Belgian biathlete. She competed at the 2022 Winter Olympics, in Women's individual, and Women's sprint.

She competed at the Biathlon World Championships 2020, and Biathlon World Championships 2021.

References

External links 
 BELGIAN BIATHLETE LOTTE LIE PICTURED ACTION- Shutterstock
 Belgian biathlete Lotte Lie pictured in action during the women'sPhoto by LAURIE DIEFFEMBACQ - Getty Images
 

1995 births
Belgian female biathletes
Norwegian female biathletes
Living people
Biathletes at the 2022 Winter Olympics
Olympic biathletes of Belgium
People from Levanger
Norwegian emigrants to Belgium
Sportspeople from Trøndelag